The GPA Gaelic Team of the Year known for sponsorship reason as The Opel Gaelic Team of the Year awards were an awards ceremony to honour the performances of
Gaelic Athletic Association players. The awards were judged and awarded by the Gaelic Players Association.
In 2011 the GAA and GPA announced that their respective annual player awards schemes were to merge under the sponsorship of Opel.
The first merged awards were given out in 2011.

Hurling awards

2010 winners
Brian Codd (Wexford),  Paul Curran Evan Costello (Laois), Tommy Walsh (Kilkenny), Michael Walsh (Waterford), Mike Whyte (Offaly), Michael Fennelly (Kilkenny), Brendan Maher (Tipperary), Andy Kennedy (Limerick), Sean Cleary (Offaly), Lar Corbett (Tipperary), Eoin Kelly (Tipperary),Gearoid Burke (Laois), Aodan Keally (Offaly),Barry O'Dowd(Roscommon)

2009 winners
PJ Ryan (Kilkenny)
Ollie Canning (Galway)
JJ Delaney (Kilkenny)
Jackie Tyrell (Kilkenny)
Tommy Walsh (Kilkenny)
Conor O'Mahony (Tipperary)
Padraic Maher (Tipperary)
Shane McGrath (Tipperary)
Michael Rice (Kilkenny)
Eddie Brennan (Kilkenny)
Seamus Callanan (Tipperary)
Eoin Larkin (Kilkenny)
John Mullane (Waterford)
Henry Shefflin (Kilkenny)
Lar Corbett (Tipperary)

2008 winners
Brendan Cummins (Tipperary)
Michael Kavanagh (Kilkenny)
Noel Hickey (Kilkenny)
Jackie Tyrell (Kilkenny)
Tommy Walsh (Kilkenny)
Conor O'Mahony (Tipperary)
JJ Delaney (Kilkenny)
Shane McGrath (Tipperary)
James 'Cha' Fitzpatrick (Kilkenny)
Ben O'Connor (Cork)
Henry Shefflin (Kilkenny)
Eoin Larkin (Kilkenny)
Eddie Brennan (Kilkenny)
Eoin Kelly (Waterford)
John Mullane (Waterford)

2007 winners
Hurling Team of the Year

2006 winners
1. Dónal Óg Cusack (Cork)
2. Eoin Murphy (Waterford)
3. Paul Curran (Tipperary)
4. Brian Murphy (Cork)
5. Tony Browne (Waterford)
6. Ronan Curran (Cork)
7. Tommy Walsh (Kilkenny)
8. Jerry O'Connor (Cork)
9. James 'Cha' Fitzpatrick (Kilkenny)
10. Dan Shanahan (Waterford)
11. Henry Shefflin (Kilkenny)
12. Martin Comerford (Kilkenny)
13. Ben O'Connor (Cork)
14. Eoin Kelly (Tipperary)
15. Joe Deane (Cork)

Football awards

2010 winners
Brendan McVeigh (Down), Charlie Harrison (Sligo), Michael Shields (Cork), Philly McMahon (Dublin),
Kevin McKernan (Down), Emmet Bolton (Kildare),
Paudie Kissane (Cork), Paddy Keenan (Louth),
John Galvin (Limerick), Daniel Hughes (Down),
Martin Clarke (Down), John Doyle (Kildare), Daniel Goulding (Cork), Brendan Coulter (Down), Bernard Brogan (Dublin)

2009 winners
Diarmuid Murphy (Kerry), Marc Ó Sé (Kerry), Michael Shields (Cork), Tom O'Sullivan (Kerry), Tomás Ó Sé (Kerry), Graham Canty (Cork), John Miskella(Cork), Dermot Earley (Kildare), Seamus Scanlon (Kerry), Paul Galvin (Kerry), Pearse O'Neill (Cork), Paddy Kelly (Cork), Daniel Goulding (Cork), Declan O'Sullivan (Kerry), Tommy Walsh (Kerry)

2008 winners
Football Team of the Year

2007 winners
Football Team of the Year

2006 winners
1. Stephen Cluxton (Dublin)
2. Marc Ó Sé(Kerry)
3. Barry Owens (Fermanagh)
4. Tom O'Sullivan (Kerry)
5. Seamus Moynihan (Kerry)
6. Bryan Cullen (Dublin)
7. Aidan O'Mahony (Kerry)
8. Nicholas Murphy (Cork)
9. Darragh Ó Sé (Kerry)
10. Alan Dillon (Mayo)
11. Alan Brogan (Dublin)
12. Ciarán McDonald (Mayo)
13. Conor Mortimer (Mayo)
14. Kieran Donaghy (Kerry)
15. Rónán Clarke (Armagh)

References

External links
GPA Awards Announced
Official GPA Website
Official GAA Website
Media report on 2006 hurling selection
Report on 2006 hurling nominations
Media report

Gaelic football awards
Gaelic games awards
Gaelic Team of the Year